Sciades is a genus of sea catfishes mostly found along the Atlantic Ocean and Caribbean Sea coasts of Central and South America. One species, S. dowii, occurs on the Pacific side from Panama to Ecuador, another, S. paucus, is a freshwater form found in Australia, while S. sona is a widespread species found along the Indian Ocean coasts of South Asia east into the Pacific to Polynesia. The genus Ariopsis has been merged with Sciades by some authorities.

Currently, eight described species are in this genus:
 Sciades couma (Valenciennes, 1840) (Couma sea-catfish)
 Sciades dowii (T. N. Gill, 1863) (brown sea-catfish)
 Sciades herzbergii (Bloch, 1794) (Pemecou sea catfish)
 Sciades parkeri (Traill, 1832) (gillbacker sea catfish)
 Sciades passany (Valenciennes, 1840) (Passany sea catfish)
 Sciades paucus (Kailola, 2000)
 Sciades proops (Valenciennes, 1840) (crucifix sea catfish)
 Sciades sona (F. Hamilton, 1822) (Sona sea catfish)

References
 

Ariidae
Catfish genera
Taxa named by Johannes Peter Müller
Taxa named by Franz Hermann Troschel